Barro is one of 28 parishes (administrative divisions) in Llanes, a municipality within the province and autonomous community of Asturias, in northern Spain.

Villages
Balmori
Barro (Barru)
Niembro (Niembru)

References

Parishes in Llanes